The following events occurred in May 1963:

May 1, 1963 (Wednesday)
West New Guinea, the last remaining Netherlands possession in what had been the Dutch East Indies, was formally transferred to Indonesian control by the United Nations in ceremonies at Hollandia. The Indonesians renamed the territory West Irian, and Hollandia was renamed Kotabaru.
American mountaineer Jim Whittaker and Sherpa guide Nawang Gombu became the fifth and sixth people to successfully reach the top of Mount Everest, following Edmund Hillary and Tenzing Norgay (May 29, 1953), and Ernst Reiss and Fritz Luchsinger (May 18, 1957). Whittaker, a 32-year-old resident of Redmond, Washington, became the first American to accomplish the feat.
Sir Winston Churchill announced his retirement from politics at the age of 88, for reasons of health. He pledged that he would remain an M.P. until Parliament was dissolved but would not stand for re-election.
Former U.S. Vice-President (and future President) Richard M. Nixon continued his retirement from politics with the announcement that he would join the New York City law firm of Mudge, Stern, Baldwin & Todd on June 1.
McDonnell Aircraft Corporation began tests to qualify the attitude control and maneuver electronics (ACME) system for the Gemini spacecraft, after completing development testing. The subject of the qualification tests was the first production prototype ACME unit received from Minneapolis-Honeywell.
Died: Lope K. Santos, 83, Filipino writer and politician

May 2, 1963 (Thursday)
This was the only sounding rocket developed in Germany.
Hundreds of African Americans, including children, were arrested during the Birmingham campaign as they set out from the Sixteenth Street Baptist Church in Birmingham, Alabama, to protest segregation. There were 959 people taken on the first day. Two days later, Public Safety Commissioner Eugene "Bull" Connor would order the use of dogs and fire hoses to repel new demonstrators, images of which were picked up by news media around the world.
Charles W. Mathews, new Acting Manager of Project Gemini, reviewed the current status of the spacecraft, launch vehicles, and ground facilities for the Gemini Management Panel. Modifications of launch complexes 19 and 14, of the tracking network, and of Atlantic Missile Range checkout facilities were all on schedule, although no margin remained for complex 19 work. The Atlas and Agena presented no problems, but the Gemini launch vehicle schedule was tight; technical problems, notably stage I longitudinal oscillations and stage II engine instability, were compounded by funding difficulties. The Gemini spacecraft, suffering from late deliveries by subcontractors, was being reprogrammed.

May 3, 1963 (Friday)
Condingup, Western Australia, was declared a townsite.
In Brazil, 37 of the 50 people on a Cruzeiro do Sul airliner were killed as the Convair CV-340 was attempting to return to São Paulo shortly after its takeoff from the Congonhas Airport. The plane had been bound for Rio de Janeiro but its right engine caught fire. In its final approach to the runway, the aircraft nosed up to a 45-degree angle, stalled and struck a house on the Avenida Piassang.
Development testing of the Gemini Agena Model 8247 main engine at Arnold Engineering Development Center (AEDC) began with an instrumentation run. After oxidizer contamination resulted in a scrubbed test on May 7, test firing began on May 13. The major objective of AEDC testing was to verify the engine's ability to start at least five times. The AEDC rocket test facility permitted firing of the engine in an environment simulating orbital temperature and pressure. During the course of the tests, two major problems emerged: turbine overspeed and gas generator valve high temperature operations. At the Atlas/Agena coordination meeting of July 2, Air Force Space Systems Division reported that a turbine overspeed sensing and shutdown circuit had been proposed to resolve the first problem and that solutions to the gas generator problem were being intensively investigated.

May 4, 1963 (Saturday)
The sinking of a motor launch on the Nile River drowned more than 185 people in Egypt, nearly all of them Muslim pilgrims who were beginning the journey to Mecca from the city of Maghagha. The boat's capacity was only 80 people, but more than 200 people crowded on board to make the trip. Among the 15 people who survived were the boat's captain, its owner and its conductor, who were all jailed while the matter was investigated.
All 55 people on an Air Afrique airliner died when the Douglas DC-6 crashed into Mount Cameroon less than half an hour after takeoff from Douala in Cameroon, bound for Lagos in Nigeria. One passenger, a U.S. diplomatic courier, initially survived the crash, but would die of his injuries on May 10.
A fire at the Le Monde Theater in Diourbel, Senegal, killed 64 people.
New York Governor Nelson Rockefeller secretly married his girlfriend, Margaretta "Happy" Murphy, despite being advised that his remarriage, after divorcing the year before, would hurt his chances for the Republican Party nomination for the U.S. presidency. Television comedian Carol Burnett, 28, married television producer Joe Hamilton in a ceremony in Juarez, Mexico, on the same day, after Hamilton had obtained "a quickie Mexican divorce".
Police used high-pressure water hoses and police dogs to disperse a crowd of more than 1,000 African-American protesters in Birmingham, Alabama.
Died: Dickey Kerr, 69, American baseball pitcher for the Chicago White Sox, praised later for remaining honest during the corrupt Black Sox Scandal in 1919.

May 5, 1963 (Sunday)
Celebrations were held in the city of Huế in South Vietnam, to honor the ordination of Ngo Dinh Thuc, elder brother of President Ngo Dinh Diem, as the Roman Catholic Archbishop of Huế. In advance of the event, the President decreed that religious banners could not be displayed above the national flag, a rule that would lead to tragedy at a Buddhist celebration three days later.
After 18 years of denial, the Soviet Union confirmed that it had recovered and identified the burned remains of Adolf Hitler on April 30, 1945. Marshal Vasily Sokolovsky, the Chief of Operations during the Battle of Berlin, publicly disclosed the details to American researcher Cornelius Ryan and allowed him unprecedented access to classified documents, and allowed him and English historian John Erickson to interview fifty top-ranking officials. Sokolovsky told Ryan, "You should be informed that the Soviet Union officially regards Hitler as dead." Previously, the official Soviet position had been that of the Soviet commander, Georgy Zhukov, who had said, "We have found no body definitely identified as Hitler's. For all we know, he may be in Spain or Argentina."  
The 4th Pan American Games drew to a close in São Paulo, Brazil.
Graduate student Beverly Samans, 23, became the tenth murder victim of Albert DeSalvo. Unlike the first nine Boston Strangler victims, Samans was stabbed repeatedly, although he repeated his modus operandi of strangling a woman with her own stocking. Her body would be discovered three days later.
NASA awarded Letter Contract NAS 9-1484 to North American for the Paraglider Landing System Program. Work under the contract was to be completed by May 1, 1964, and initial funding was $6.7 million. This contract reflected a reorientation of the paraglider program. Its primary purpose was to develop a complete paraglider landing system and to define all the components of such a system. Among the major tasks this entailed were: (1) completing the design, development, and testing of paraglider subsystems and building and maintaining mock-ups of the vehicle and its subsystems; (2) modifying the paraglider wings procured under earlier contracts to optimize deployment characteristics and designing a prototype wing incorporating aerodynamic improvements; (3) modifying the two full-scale test vehicles produced under Contract NAS 9-167 to incorporate prototype paraglider landing system hardware, modifying the Advanced Paraglider Trainer produced under Contract NAS 9-539 to a tow test vehicle, and fabricating a new, second tow test vehicle; and (4) conducting a flight test program including half-scale tow tests, full-scale boilerplate parachute tests, full-scale deployment tests, and tow test vehicle flight tests. Contract negotiations were completed on July 12, and the final contract was dated September 25, 1963.
Born: Kimiyasu Kudō, former Japanese professional baseball pitcher and manager, in Nagoya City, Japan

May 6, 1963 (Monday)
The Limitation Bill came before the UK parliament, an amendment to the statute of limitations. The resulting act would not be fully repealed until 1980.
Timothy Leary was dismissed from his post at Harvard University for failing to carry out his duties.
Notable civil rights activist and comedian Dick Gregory was beaten and jailed by police while participating in the Birmingham campaign.
The Gemini Program Planning Board approved the Air Force Systems Command development plan for the Gemini/Titan II improvement program. The plan covered the development work required to man-rate the Titan II beyond the requirements of the Titan II weapon system and included three major areas: (1) reducing longitudinal oscillation levels to NASA requirements, (2) reducing the incidence of stage II engine combustion instability, and (3) cleaning up the design of stage I and II engines and augmenting the continuing engine improvement program to enhance engine reliability. The work was to be funded by the Titan Program Office of Air Force Ballistics Systems Division and managed by the Titan II/Gemini Coordination Committee, which had been established April 1. NASA found the plan satisfactory.
Born: Alessandra Ferri, Italian ballerina, in Milan
Died: Ted Weems, 61, American bandleader, of emphysema; and Monty Woolley, 75, American actor

May 7, 1963 (Tuesday)
The communications satellite Telstar II was launched into Earth orbit to replace the first Telstar satellite, which had stopped functioning on February 21 because of damage by the Van Allen radiation belts. As with the first Telstar, the satellite amplified the signals that it was receiving from ground station transmitters.
Between May 7 and 17, Aerojet-General delivered the first flight engines for Gemini launch vehicle No. 1 to Martin-Baltimore. Aerojet-General had provided a set of Type "E" dummy engines March 18. These were installed and used to lay out tubing and wiring while the launch vehicle was being assembled. They were later removed and flight engines installed in stage II, May 7, and stage I, May 17. Some rework was required because of differences in configuration between the dummy and flight engines, and engine installation was completed May 21. Wiring and continuity checks followed (May 22-25), and final horizontal tests were completed May 27.
Died: Theodore von Kármán, 81, Hungarian mathematician, engineer and physicist

May 8, 1963 (Wednesday)
Dr. No, the first James Bond film, premiered in the United States with Sean Connery as Agent 007.  The film had been seen in Europe since its premiere in London on October 5, 1962.
The Hue Vesak shootings took place when soldiers of the Army of the Republic of Vietnam (ARVN) opened fire on Buddhists who had defied a ban on the flying of the Buddhist flag on Vesak, the birthday of Gautama Buddha.  Eight people were killed. Earlier, South Vietnam's President Ngo Dinh Diem allowed the flying of the Vatican flag, symbolic of Roman Catholicism, in honor of his brother, Archbishop Ngo Dinh Thuc.
Born: Anthony Field, Australian musician, member of The Wiggles; in Kellyville, New South Wales

May 9, 1963 (Thursday)
The 1963 Cannes Film Festival opened.
After the first six attempts at a successful launch of the MIDAS (Missile Defense Alarm System) satellite failed, MIDAS 7 was successfully placed into a polar orbit. During the first three years of attempts, three of the satellites failed to reach orbit, while the other three were plagued with power failures. MIDAS 7 operated for 47 days, and detected nine Soviet missile launches.
Qualification testing of the Gemini parachute recovery system began at El Centro, California. Four more land-impact tests followed, the last on June 28; all test objectives were successfully accomplished. The main parachute tucking problem, which had appeared and been resolved during development tests, recurred in drops 4 and 5 (June 17, 28). Although this problem did not affect parachute performance, Gemini Project Office decided to suspend qualification testing until the condition could be studied and corrected. Northrop Ventura attributed the tucking to excessive fullness of the parachute canopy and resolved the problem by adding control tapes to maintain proper circumference. Four bomb-drop tests during July proved this solution satisfactory, and qualification testing resumed August 8.

May 10, 1963 (Friday)
A settlement was reached between the Southern Christian Leadership Conference and the leading business owners of Birmingham, Alabama, with the SCLC agreeing to call off its boycott of local retailers, who in return "agreed to desegregate lunch counters, rest rooms, fitting rooms and drinking fountains" and to hire more African-Americans for sales and clerical jobs.
Author Maurice Sendak, working on his first book for children, made the decision to abandon his original title, Where the Wild Horses Are, after concluding that horses were too difficult to draw, and changed the characters in the book to friendly monsters.  The book, Where the Wild Things Are, would become a Caldecott Medal winning bestseller and launch Sendak's career.
Born: Sławomir Skrzypek, Polish financier, in Katowice (killed in the 2010 Polish Air Force Tu-154 crash)
Died:
Léonce Crenier, 74, French Catholic monk who promoted the theological/political concept of Precarity
Eugene "Big Daddy" Lipscomb, 31, American NFL player for the Pittsburgh Steelers, of a heroin overdose

May 11, 1963 (Saturday)
Canada's new Prime Minister, Lester B. Pearson, agreed to allow American nuclear weapons to be placed in Canada, following a two-day meeting with U.S. President John F. Kennedy at the President's private estate in Hyannis Port, Massachusetts.
Born: Natasha Richardson, English actress, daughter of Vanessa Redgrave and Tony Richardson (died 2009)
Died: Herbert Spencer Gasser, 74, American neurophysiologist and 1944 Nobel Prize laureate

May 12, 1963 (Sunday)
Kenji Kimihara of Japan won the Lake Biwa Marathon, Japan's oldest annual marathon race.
Dr. Charles A. Berry, Chief, Aerospace Medical Operations Office, Manned Spacecraft Center, pronounced Gordon Cooper in excellent mental and physical condition for the upcoming Mercury-Atlas 9 (MA-9) mission.
Between May 12 and 19, some 1,020 reporters, commentators, technicians, and others of the news media from the U.S. and several foreign countries gathered at Cape Canaveral, with another 130 at the NASA News Center in Hawaii, to cover the Mercury-Atlas 9 (MA-9) mission. Over the course of these days at Cape Canaveral, Western Union estimated that approximately 600,000 words of copy were filed, of which 140,000 were transmitted to European media. This does not include stories phoned in by reporters nor copy filed from the Pacific News Center, or for radio and TV coverage. During the 546,167-statute-mile flight, television audiences could see the astronaut or views inside and outside the spacecraft from time to time. Approximately 1 hour and 58 minutes were programed. Visual coverage was relayed to Europe via satellites.
Scheduled to make his nationwide television debut on The Ed Sullivan Show, folk singer Bob Dylan refused to perform after censors at the CBS network wouldn't clear him to sing "Talkin' John Birch Paranoid Blues". Dylan would go on to greater fame, singing with Joan Baez in August during the "March on Washington".

May 13, 1963 (Monday)
The U.S. Supreme Court decided the case of Brady v. Maryland, setting the principle that in before trial in a criminal case, the prosecution disclose any exculpatory evidence (which might exonerate the defendant) to the defense team.  Named for accused killer John Leo Brady, the "Brady disclosure" is now a requirement for prosecutors.  Brady, who had been sentenced to death in the original 1958 case, would be afforded a new trial, resulting in a sentence of life imprisonment, from which he would eventually be paroled.
The comic strip Modesty Blaise made its debut in England as part of the Evening Standard of London. 
A smallpox outbreak hit Stockholm, Sweden, lasting until July.

May 14, 1963 (Tuesday)
In Denmark, the Frederick IX Bridge was officially opened, spanning the Guldborgsund strait between the islands of Falster and Lolland.
Kuwait became the 111th member of the United Nations, over the objections of Iraq.
The new office of Parliamentary Secretary was created in the administration of Canada.
An attempt was made to launch Mercury-Atlas 9 (MA-9), but difficulty developed in the fuel pump of the diesel engine used to pull the gantry away from the launch vehicle. This involved a delay of approximately 129 minutes after the countdown had reached T-60 minutes. After these repairs were effected, failure at the Bermuda tracking station of a computer converter, important in the orbital insertion decision, forced the mission to be canceled at T-13 minutes. At 6:00 p.m. Eastern Daylight Time (EDT), Walter C. Williams reported that the Bermuda equipment had been repaired, and the mission was rescheduled for May 15, 1963.
The Rolling Stones signed their first recording contract, after talent scout Dick Rowe asked them to audition for Decca Records.

May 15, 1963 (Wednesday)

NASA launched Mercury-Atlas 9, designated Faith 7 and scheduled for a 22-orbit mission, from Cape Canaveral at 8:04 a.m. Eastern Daylight Time (EDT), with astronaut L. Gordon Cooper as the pilot. This was the last mission of the Mercury program. Cooper entered the Mercury spacecraft at 5:33 a.m. the morning of May 15, and it was announced over Mercury Control by Lt. Colonel John A. Powers that "barring unforeseen technical difficulties the launch would take place at 8:00 a.m. e.d.t." Cooper reported that he took a brief nap while awaiting the launch. The countdown progressed without incident until T-11 minutes and 30 seconds when some difficulty developed in the guidance equipment and a brief hold was called. Later, a momentary hold was called at T-19 seconds to determine whether the systems went into automatic sequencing, which occurred as planned. The liftoff was excellent, and visual tracking could be made for about 2 minutes through a cloudless sky. The weather was considerably clearer than on the day before. The Faith 7 flight sequencing - booster engine cut off, escape tower jettison, sustainer engine cut off - operated perfectly and the spacecraft was inserted into orbit at 8:09 a.m. EDT at a speed that was described as almost unbelievably correct. By the second orbit, temperature conditions were quite comfortable, so much so, in fact, that the astronaut took a short nap. During the third orbit, Cooper deployed the flashing light experiment successfully and reported that he was able to see the flashing beacon on the night side of the fourth orbit. Thus, Cooper became the first human to launch a satellite (the beacon) while in orbital flight.
As of this date, the number of contractor personnel at Cape Canaveral directly involved in supporting Project Mercury were as follows: McDonnell, 251 persons for Contract NAS 5-59 and 23 persons for spacecraft 15B (MA-10 work); Federal Electric Corporation, 8.
Simulated off-the-pad Gemini ejection seat testing resumed with test No. 9. McDonnell and Weber Aircraft had completely redesigned the blackboard and mechanism linkage to obtain more reliable load paths and mechanism actuation, and to eliminate the "add-on" character of the many features and capabilities introduced during seat development which contributed to the unsuccessful test in February. The new design was proved in a series of tests culminating in a preliminary ejection test on April 22. Test No. 9 was followed by test No. 9a on May 25. Both tests were completely successful. Test Nos. 10 and 11 (July 2, 16) completed the development phase of pad ejection testing. Both were dual ejection tests. No. 10 was completely unsuccessful, but No. 11 was marred by the failure of a seat recovery chute (not part of the spacecraft ejection system), resulting in major damage to the seat when it hit the ground.
The company Weight Watchers was founded by housewife Jean Nidetch, with the first meeting held at a loft above a movie theater in Little Neck, a neighborhood in the New York City borough of Queens.

May 16, 1963 (Thursday)

Astronaut Gordon Cooper returned to Earth safely after making 22 orbits and traveling  in the Faith 7 capsule. During the reentry operation, Cooper fired the retrorockets manually, by pushing a button for the first of three rockets to start the sequence. He attained the proper reentry attitude by using his observation window scribe marks to give proper reference with the horizon and to determine if he were rolling. John Glenn, aboard the command ship off the Japanese coast, provided the countdown for the retrosequence and also advised Cooper when to jettison the retropack. Faith 7 landed  from the prime recovery ship, the carrier  (Task Force 130), after a 34-hour, 19-minute, and 49-second space flight. The spacecraft was sighted by the carrier and helicopters were deployed to circle the spacecraft during its final descent. Swimmers dropped from the helicopters to fix the flotation collar and retrieve the antenna fairing. Cooper remained in his spacecraft until he was hoisted aboard the carrier. A motor whaleboat towed the spacecraft alongside the ship. The mission was an unqualified success. During the flight the use of consumables - electrical power, oxygen, and attitude fuel - ran considerably below the flight plan. On the 15th orbit 75 percent of the primary supply of oxygen remained, and the reserve supply was untouched. The unusual low consumption rate of all supplies prompted teasing by the Faith 7 communicators. They called the astronaut a "miser" and requested that he "stop holding his breath."
Died: Oleg Penkovsky, 44, formerly a Soviet Army colonel and spy, was executed five days after being sentenced to death by a military tribunal for passing secrets to the United States and the United Kingdom.

May 17, 1963 (Friday)
Challenger Bruno Sammartino faced champion Buddy Rogers of the World Wide Wrestling Federation (now WWE) in a professional wrestling match at New York's Madison Square Garden.  Sammartino, using his signature move, "the Italian backbreaker", defeated Rogers in only 48 seconds, and would reign as the WWWF champion for the next eight years.
A U.S. Army OH-23 helicopter with two men on board, Captains Ben W. Stutts and Charleton W. Voltz, was shot down by North Korean ground forces after straying north of the Demilitarized Zone. The two men would be freed, after 365 days of imprisonment, on May 16, 1964, following the United Nations Command agreeing to sign a statement that Stutts and Voltz had committed espionage, but North Korea declined to return the helicopter.
In Germany, the Regensburg trolleybus system went out of service.

May 18, 1963 (Saturday)
Sukarno (sometimes referred to as Ahmed Sukarno) was named as President for Life of Indonesia. Sukarno, who had ruled since 1945, would serve for another four years before being deposed, and would spend the rest of his life afterward under house arrest, dying on June 21, 1970. 
Only the driver and 14 people survived. The victims were African-American farm laborers and their families, on their way home from a day of work of harvesting beans at the Kirchman Brothers Farm.
Rocketdyne successfully tested a  thrust chamber assembly (TCA) for the Gemini reentry control system (RCS) in pulse operation. Earlier efforts had aimed primarily at achieving steady-state performance, until tests revealed that such performance was no guarantee of adequate pulse performance. Char rate on pulse-cycled, 25-pound RCS TCAs proved to be approximately 1.5 times greater than identical TCAs tested in continuous runs. Several TCAs failed when the ablative material in the combustion chamber was exhausted and the casing charred through. The development of a suitable ablative thrust chamber, however, remained a major problem. No RCS TCA design was yet complete, and no  orbit attitude and maneuver system TCAs had yet been tested on a pulse-duty cycle. Rocketdyne was already three months late in delivering TCA hardware to McDonnell, and all other components had been rescheduled for later delivery. Completion of development testing of components had also been slipped three months.
Died: Ernie Davis, 23, African-American football star who won the 1961 Heisman Trophy, but was diagnosed with leukemia after signing with the Cleveland Browns

May 19, 1963 (Sunday)
British driver Bob Anderson won the 1963 Rome Grand Prix.
On a national televised press conference, emanating from Cocoa Beach, Florida, astronaut Gordon Cooper reviewed his experiences aboard the Faith 7 during the Mercury-Atlas 9 (MA-9) mission. Cooper, in his discussion, proceeded systematically throughout the mission from countdown through recovery. He opened his comments by complimenting Calvin Fowler of General Dynamics for his fine job on the console during the Atlas launching. During the flight, he reported that he saw the haze layer formerly mentioned by Wally Schirra during the Sigma 7 flight (Mercury-Atlas 8) and John Glenn's "fireflies" (MA-6). As for the sleep portion, Cooper felt he had answered with finality the question of whether sleep was possible in space flight. He also mentioned that he had to anchor his thumbs to the helmet restraint strap to prevent his arms from floating, which might accidently trip a switch. Probably the most astonishing feature was his ability visually to distinguish objects on the earth. He spoke of seeing an African town where the flashing light experiment was conducted; he saw several Australian cities, including the large oil refineries at Perth; he saw wisps of smoke from rural houses on the Asiatic continent; and he mentioned seeing Miami Beach, Florida, and the Clear Lake area near Houston. With reference to particular problems while in flight, the astronaut told of the difficulties he experienced with the condensate water pumping system. During the conference, when Dr. Robert C. Seamans was asked about the possibilities of a Mercury-Atlas 10 (MA-10) flight, he replied that "It is quite unlikely."

May 20, 1963 (Monday)

The two men, both Soviet citizens, had begun play on March 23 in Moscow. Under the rules, Petrosian's five wins (worth one point each) and 15 draws ( point each) brought him to  points first to win the series.
The South African Police Cross for Bravery was instituted.
African-American civil rights activist Medgar Evers went on the air on the WLBT-TV News in Jackson, Mississippi, to deliver an editorial in favor of integration and civil rights. WLBT allowed the unprecedented use of its airtime after pressure from the Federal Communications Commission to permit a response to segregationists. Evers would be murdered at his home three weeks later, on June 12.
Potato broker Earl Clark opened the Dutch Wonderland Family Amusement Park near Lancaster, Pennsylvania.
Flight Crew Operations Division reported that NASA Astronaut Group 2 had completed a zero-gravity indoctrination program at Wright-Patterson Air Force Base, Ohio, with the support of the 6750th Aerospace Medical Research Laboratory. A modified KC-135 aircraft carried the astronauts on two flights each. A flight included 20 zero-gravity parabolas, each lasting 30 seconds.

May 21, 1963 (Tuesday)

Zalman Shazar was elected by the Knesset as the third President of Israel, winning 67-33 over Peretz Bernstein. As with the first two Presidents of Israel (Chaim Weizmann and Yitzhak Ben-Zvi), Shazar was a native of Russia. He had been born as Shneur Zalman Rubashov in Mir, now part of Belarus.
In a White House ceremony, President John F. Kennedy presented astronaut Gordon Cooper with the NASA Distinguished Service Medal. Other members of the Mercury operations team receiving medals for outstanding leadership were as follows: G. Merritt Preston, Manager of Project Mercury Operations at Cape Canaveral; Floyd L. Thompson, Langley Research Center; Kenneth S. Kleinknecht, Manager of the Mercury Project Office; Christopher C. Kraft, Director of Flight Operations Division, Manned Spacecraft Center; and Major General Leighton I. Davis, Commander, Air Force Missile Test Center.
Manned Spacecraft Center began a Gemini atmospheric reentry simulation study. The fixed-base simulator contained a handcontroller and pilot displays to represent the Gemini reentry vehicle. The purpose of the study was to evaluate manual control of the Gemini spacecraft during reentry, before beginning the centrifuge program to be conducted at Naval Air Development Center. The reentry simulation study was completed June 20.
As part of the general revision of the Gemini flight program that NASA Headquarters had approved April 29, representatives of NASA, Air Force Space Systems Division, and Lockheed met to establish basic ground rules for revising Agena development and delivery schedules. The first rendezvous mission using the Agena target vehicle was now planned for April 1965, some seven-and-one-half months later than had been anticipated in October 1962. Six months would separate the second Agena launch from the first, and subsequent flights would be at three-month, rather than two-month, intervals. The revised schedule was agreed on at the Atlas/Agena coordination meeting on June 6-7, 1963. Among the major features of the new schedule: Agena communications and control subsystem development was to be completed by December 1963 (back six weeks); other Lockheed development work was to be completed by January 1964 (back three and one-half months); assembly and modification of the first target vehicle was to start April 2, 1964, with the vehicle to be accepted and delivered in January 1965; the first Atlas target launch vehicle was to be delivered in December 1964; the schedule for component manufacturing and deliveries was to be so arranged that the second target vehicle could back up the first, given about nine months' notice.

May 22, 1963 (Wednesday)
Greek anti-Fascist politician Grigoris Lambrakis, shortly after delivering the keynote speech at an anti-war meeting in Thessaloniki, was run down by a trikyklo (a three-wheeled delivery truck) and then clubbed to death by hired killers. Lambrakis suffered brain injuries and died in the hospital five days later. The assassination would become the basis for a novel by Vassilis Vassilikos, which later was adapted to the film Z.
President Kennedy at a regular press conference responded to a question regarding the desirability of another Mercury flight by saying that NASA should and would make that final judgment.
American Football League team owner Lamar Hunt of the Dallas Texans agreed to move the AFL champion club to Kansas City, Missouri and rename them the Kansas City Chiefs. The AFL trustees would approve the move a week later.

May 23, 1963 (Thursday)
Fidel Castro visited the Soviet Union.
AS Monaco were victorious in the finals of the Coupe de France football competition, defeating Olympique Lyonnais 2-0 at Parc des Princes.
The first successful interception of an orbiting satellite by a ground-based missile took place as part of the American program, Project MUDFLAP. A Nike-Zeus missile, launched from Kwajalein Atoll, passed close enough to an orbiting Lockheed Agena-D satellite to have disabled it with an explosion. Seven other tests would be made, ending on January 13, 1966.
The first engineering prototype of the Gemini onboard computer completed integration testing with the inertial platform at International Business Machines Corporation (IBM) and was delivered to McDonnell. At McDonnell, the computer underwent further tests. Some trouble developed during the initial test, but IBM technicians corrected the condition and the computer successfully passed diagnostic test checks.

May 24, 1963 (Friday)
 Attorney General Robert F. Kennedy invited James Baldwin and other Black leaders to discuss race relations at his apartment in Manhattan. The turbulent meeting gained wide publicity and had a significant impact on Kennedy.  
Project Emily came to an end in the United Kingdom when the last squadron of Thor nuclear missile stations, at RAF Hemswell, was disbanded.
The New York Journal-American said in a copyrighted story that NASA had revealed in a closed session of a congressional subcommittee that there had been five fatalities in the Soviet cosmonaut program, all of which had been covered up. According to the source, Serenty Shiborin had been the first man in space, launched in February 1959 and "never heard of again after 28 minutes when the signals went dead". Other failed launches were said to have been Piotr Dolgov on October 11, 1960; Vassilievitch Zowodovsky in April 1961; and two persons, possibly a man and a woman, launched together on May 17, 1961. Alexei Adzhubei, the editor of the newspaper Izvestia and the son-in-law of Soviet Premier Nikita Khrushchev, denied the reports of four of the five deaths in the newspaper's May 27 edition, saying that the people had been "technicians working on space equipment" and that two of them were still alive, although no denial was made about the alleged 1959 death of Siborin.
William M. Bland, Deputy Manager, Mercury Project Office, told an audience at the Aerospace Writers' Association Convention at Dallas, Texas, that "contrary to common belief, the Mercury spacecraft consumables have never been stretched like a rubber band to their limit in performing any of the missions." He pointed out that consumables such as electrical power, coolant water, oxygen, and carbon dioxide absorption were always available with large safety margins at the close of the flights. For example, astronaut Walter Schirra had a 9-hour primary oxygen supply at the end of his flight.
Born: Michael Chabon, American novelist (The Mysteries of Pittsburgh), in Washington, D.C.
Died: Elmore James, 45, American blues musician, of a heart attack

May 25, 1963 (Saturday)
The Organization of African Unity (OAU) was established in Addis Ababa, Ethiopia, by representatives from 32 African nations. On July 9, 2002, the OAU, by then with 53 members, would be replaced by the African Union.
President Antonio Segni asked Aldo Moro to become the new Prime Minister of Italy.
At the track and field competition for six universities in what is now the Pac-12 Conference, Phil Shinnick jumped  in the long jump,  ahead of the world record set by Igor Ter-Ovanesyan, but "two officials, whose only duty was to place the wind gauge on the long jump runway and watch it to make sure the wind was blowing at less than the allowable limit, were not paying attention", so the mark was not submitted as a world record.
Born: Mike Myers, Canadian actor and comedian, in the Toronto suburb of Scarborough, Ontario

May 26, 1963 (Sunday)
Less than two years after he had been released from years of imprisonment, Jomo Kenyatta was assured to become the first Prime Minister of Kenya when his Kenya African National Union won 83 of the 129 seats in the National Assembly in the Kenyan national election.
A rare case of two independent tornadic thunderstorms, near Oklahoma City, yielded data that would lead to the recognition of "a new stage in the development of  thunderstorms: the severe/right-moving, or SR, stage".
Afghanistan and Pakistan agreed to resume diplomatic relations that had been severed on September 6, 1960, following a conference between officials in Tehran at the invitation of the Shah of Iran. 
The 1963 Monaco Grand Prix was won by Graham Hill.
Born: 
Simon Armitage, British poet, playwright and novelist, in Huddersfield.
Mary Nightingale, an English newsreader and television presenter, in Scarborough, North Yorkshire.

May 27, 1963 (Monday)
Columbia Records released The Freewheelin' Bob Dylan, singer-songwriter Bob Dylan's second and most influential studio album, which opened with the song "Blowin' in the Wind".
North American began testing the half-scale two test vehicle (HSTTV) for the Paraglider Landing System Program. The first series of tests, 121 ground tows, ended on July 29. Various wing angle settings and attach points were used to provide preliminary data for rigging analysis and dynamic tow characteristics. The HSTTV was then delivered to Edwards Air Force Base on August 19, where Flight Research Center began its own series of ground tows on August 20. This series of 133 runs was concluded in September and was followed by 11 helicopter tow tests in October. Primary test objectives were to investigate paraglider liftoff characteristics, helicopter tow techniques, and the effects of wind-bending during high-speed tows.
Died: Grigoris Lambrakis, 50, Greek politician, physician and Olympic athlete, five days after being attacked.

May 28, 1963 (Tuesday)
A cyclone killed 22,000 people in and around the city of Comilla in East Pakistan (now Bangladesh).
In Greece, more than 500,000 people attended the funeral of Grigoris Lambrakis, protesting against the right-wing government.
Born: Gavin Harrison, British drummer, in Harrow
Died: Klaus Clusius, 60, German physical chemist

May 29, 1963 (Wednesday)
On the 50th anniversary of its stormy première, The Rite of Spring was performed by the London Symphony Orchestra, conducted by 88-year-old Pierre Monteux at the Royal Albert Hall. The composer, 81-year-old Igor Stravinsky, was in the audience as an honored guest.
Jim Reeves was welcomed to Ireland by show band singers Maisie McDaniel and Dermot O'Brien, at the start of his tour of Ireland, and conducted a week-long tour of U.S. military bases in England.
The U.S. Department of Defense submitted a summary of its support of the Mercury-Atlas 9 (MA-9) mission, with a notation that the department was prepared to provide support for the MA-10 launch. Other than the provision of the Atlas launch vehicle, the Department of Defense supplied the Air Force Coastal Sentry Quebec, positioned south of Japan to monitor and backup retrofire for orbits 6, 7, 21, and 22. In the southeast Pacific, the Atlantic Missile Range telemetry command ship Rose Knot Victor was positioned to provide command coverage for orbits 8 and 13. At a point between Cape Canaveral and Bermuda, the Atlantic Missile Range C-band radar ship Twin Falls Victory was stationed for reentry tracking, while the Navy's Range Tracker out of the Pacific Missile Range provided similar services in the Pacific. Other Department of Defense communications support included fixed island stations and aircraft from the several services. Rear Admiral Harold G. Bowen Jr. was in command of Task Force 140, positioned in the Atlantic Ocean in the event of recovery in that area. In addition, aircraft were available at strategic spots for sea recovery or recovery on the American or African continents. In the Pacific, recovery Task Force 130, under the command of Rear Admiral C. A. Buchanan, was composed of one aircraft carrier and 10 destroyers. This force was augmented by aircraft in contingency recovery areas at Hickam; Midway Island; Kwajalein; Guam; Tachikawa, Japan; Naha, Okinawa; Clark Field, Philippines; Singapore; Perth, Australia; Townsville; Nandi; Johnston Island; and Tahiti. Pararescuemen were available at all points except Kwajalein. The Middle East recovery forces (Task Force 109) were under the direction of Rear Admiral B. J. Semes and consisted of a seaplane tender and two destroyers supported by aircraft out of Aden, Nairobi, Mauritius, and Singapore for contingency recovery operations.
Astronaut Gordon Cooper became the sixth Mercury astronaut to be presented with Astronaut Wings by his respective service.
Titan II flight N-20, the 19th in the series of Air Force research and development flights, was launched from Cape Canaveral. It carried oxidizer standpipes and fuel accumulators to suppress longitudinal oscillations (POGO). During the spring of 1963, static firings of this configuration had been successful enough to confirm the hypothesis that POGO was caused by coupling between the missile structure and its propulsion system, resulting in an unstable closed loop system. Standpipes and accumulators, by interrupting the coupling, reduced the source of instability. Flight N-20 failed 55 seconds after launch and yielded no POGO data. Although the failure was not attributed to the installed POGO fix, Air Force Ballistics Systems Division decided officially that no further Titan II development flights would carry the POGO fix because so few test flights remained to qualify the weapon system operationally. This decision did not stand, however, and the POGO fix was flown again on N-25 (November 1), as well as on two later flights.
The vertical test facility (VTF) at Martin-Baltimore was activated. The VTF comprised a  tower and an adjacent three-story blockhouse with ground equipment similar to that used at complex 19. In it, the completely assembled Gemini launch vehicle was tested to provide a basis for comparison with subsequent tests conducted at complex 19. Each subsystem was tested separately, then combined systems tests were performed, concluding with the Combined Systems Acceptance Test, the final step before the launch vehicle was presented for Air Force acceptance.
Born:
Tom Burnett, American businessman who was one of the passengers who fought with terrorists during the hijacking of United Airlines Flight 93 on September 11, 2001; in Bloomington, Minnesota (d. 2001)
Lisa Whelchel, American TV actress and Contemporary Christian singer, best known as Blair Warner on The Facts of Life; in Littlefield, Texas
Died: Vissarion Shebalin, 61, Soviet classical composer

May 30, 1963 (Thursday)
The initial announcements were made for the first diet drink manufactured by the Coca-Cola Company, with TaB cola, with "one calorie per six-ounce serving".
Parnelli Jones of the United States won the 1963 Indianapolis 500, finishing 34 seconds ahead of Jim Clark of Scotland.
More than 500 monks demonstrated in front of South Vietnam's National Assembly building in Saigon, evading a ban on public assembly by hiring four buses and pulling the blinds down.  It was the first open protest against President Ngô Đình Diệm's regime since he came into power eight years earlier.

May 31, 1963 (Friday)
The ABC Theatre in Blackpool, UK, opened, beginning with the Holiday Carnival summer season stage show, starring Cliff Richard and The Shadows.
Winslow Air Force Station in Winslow, Arizona, ceased operations.
Died: Edith Hamilton, 95, German-born American classical scholar best known for her authorship of Mythology: Timeless Tales of Gods and Heroes

References

1963
1963-05
1963-05